The 2021 UEC European Track Championships (under-23 & junior) were the 21st continental championships for European under-23 and junior track cyclists, and the 12th since the event was renamed following the reorganisation of European track cycling in 2010. The event took place at the Omnisport Apeldoorn in Apeldoorn, Netherlands from 17 to 22 August 2021.

Medal summary

Under-23

Junior

Notes
 Competitors named in italics only participated in rounds prior to the final.

Medal table

References

External links
 Results
 European Cycling Union
 Results book

under-23
European Track Championships, 2021
European Track
International cycle races hosted by the Netherlands
European Track Championships (under-23 and junior)
Cycling in Apeldoorn